Mats Olof Gustafsson (born 29 October 1964) is a Swedish free jazz saxophone player.

Career 

Gustafsson came to the attention of lovers of improvised music as part of a duo with Christian Munthe (started in 1986), as member of Gunter Christmann's Vario project and the band Gush (started in 1988). He later played widely with Peter Brötzmann, Joe McPhee, Paul Lovens, Barry Guy, Yoshimi P-We, Derek Bailey, Magnus Broo, Otomo Yoshihide, Pat Thomas, Jim O'Rourke, Thomas Lehn, Evan Parker, Misha Mengelberg, Zu, The Ex and Sonic Youth.

Since the early 1990s Gustafsson has been a regular visitor to the United States, forming a particular affinity with Chicago musicians Hamid Drake, Michael Zerang, and Ken Vandermark and recording for Okka Disk. 

He was awarded the 2011 Nordic Council Music Prize.

Gustafsson has worked extensively with artists from the worlds of dance, theatre, poetry and painting. He has lived in Nickelsdorf, Austria since 2011.

Festival curator 
Gustafsson curated the Perspectives festivals in Västerås, Sweden in 2004, 2007 and 2009. This festival of musical improvisation is noted for its cross-genre character and creative atmosphere among musicians. The festival slogan for 2004 was "Fight Global Stupidity", 2007 "Fight Local Stupidity" and for 2009 it became "Fight (y)our stupidity".

Gustafsson was also joint curator of the 2010 Konfrontationen festival in Nickelsdorf, Austria.

Gallery
Photos

Discography

As leader
 1991: Nothing to Read (Blue Tower), with Paul Lovens
 1995: Parrot Fish Eye (Okka Disk)
 1995: For Don Cherry (Blue Tower), with Hamid Drake
 1996: Mouth Eating Trees and Related Activities (Okka Disk), with Barry Guy & Paul Lovens
 1997: Frogging (Maya), with Barry Guy
 1997: Impropositions (Phono Suecia)
 1999: The Education of Lars Jerry (Xeric)
 1999: Windows _The Music of Steve Lacy (Blue Chopsticks)
 1999: Hidros One (Caprice), with Nu-Ensemblen
 2000: Port Huron Picnic (Spool), with Kurt Newman & Mike Gennaro
 2002: The School Days and Thing (Anagram), the music of Norman Howard presented by Mats Gustafsson
 2003: Blues (Atavistic), with David Stackenäs
 2004: Hidros 3 (Smalltown Supersound), Sonic Youth With Friends
 2005: Slide (Firework Edition)
 2005: Catapult (Doubtmusic)
 2007: It Is All About... (Tyfus)
 2007: Words on the Floor (Smalltown Superjazzz), with Yoshimi P-We
 2008: Mats G Plays Duke E (Qbico)
 2008: Cosmic Debris Volume IV (Opax), with My Cat Is An Alien
 2008: The Vilnius Implosion (NoBusiness)
 2008: Mats G Plays Duke E (Qbico)
 2009: Mats G. Plays Albert A. (Qbico)
 2009  You Liked Me Five Minutes Ago (Rune Grammofon) with Fire! 
 2011 Released (Rune Grammofon) with Fire! & Jim O'Rourke
 2011 Uneleased (Rune Grammofon) with Fire! & Jim O'Rourke
 2012 In the Mouth a Hand (Rune Grammofon) w  with Fire! & Oren Ambarchi
 2012: Baro 101 (Terp ), with Paal Nilssen-Love & Mesele Asmamaw
 2012: Mats G. Plays Gullin (Sagittarius A-Star)
 2012: Birds (dEN ), with John Russell & Raymond Strid
 2012: Bengt (Utech)
 2013 Without Noticing (Rune Grammofon) with Fire! 
 2013: Eissalon (Live) (Rock Is Hell ), with Didi Kern
 2013: Vi Är Alla Guds Slavar (Otoroku), with Thurston Moore
 2014: Hidros6 Knockin'  (Not Two), with NU Ensemble
 2014 Enter (Rune Grammofon) with Fire! Orchestra
 2015 Exit (Rune Grammofon) with Fire! Orchestra
 2015 Second Exit (Rune Grammofon) with Fire! Orchestra
 2015: Hit The Wall! (Smalltown Superjazzz), with Thurston Moore
 2016 MG 50_Peace & Fire (Rune Grammofon) & Friends
 2016 She Sleeps She Sleeps (Rune Grammofon) with Fire! 
 2016: Piano Mating (Blue Tapes and X-Ray)
 2016 Ritual (Rune Grammofon) with Fire! Orchestra
 2018 The Hands (Rune Grammofon) with Fire! 
 2019 Arrival (Rune Grammofon) with Fire! Orchestra
 2020 Actions (Rune Grammofon) with Fire! Orchestra
 2021 Defeat (Rune Grammofon) with Fire! 

With AALY Trio + Ken Vandermark
 1998: Hidden in the Stomach (Silkheart)
 1998: Stumble (Wobbly Rail)
 1999: Live at the Glenn Miller Café (Wobbly Rail)
 2000: I Wonder If I Was Screaming (Crazy Wisdom)

As sideman
With Per Henrik Wallin & Kjell Nordeson
1995: Dolphins, Dolphins, Dolphins (Dragon)

With Jaap Blonk & Michael Zerang
1996: Improvisors (Kontrans)

With Ken Vandermark
1997: FJF: Blow Horn (Okka Disk)
2013: Verses (Corbett vs. Dempsey)

With Jim O'Rourke
1999: Xylophonen Virtuosen (Incus)

With David Grubbs
1999: Apertura (Blue Chopsticks)
2002: Off-Road (Blue Chopsticks)

With Thurston Moore, Lee Ranaldo & Steve Shelley
2000: New York – Ystad (Olof Bright)

With Greg Goodman & George Cremaschi
2002: They Were Gentle and Pretty Pigs (The Beak Doctor)

With Agustí Fernández
2005: Critical Mass (psi)

With Paal Nilssen-Love
2005: Splatter (Smalltown Superjazzz)

With Sonic Youth & Merzbow
2008: Andre Sider Af Sonic Youth (Sonic Youth)

With Pat Thomas and Roger Turner (The Articles)
2008: Goodbye Silence

With Barry Guy Solo/Duo
2009: Sinners, Rather than Saints (NoBusiness)

With Barry Guy and the London Jazz Composers' Orchestra with Irène Schweizer
2009: Radio Rondo/Schaffhausen Concert (Intakt)

With the Barry Guy New Orchestra
2001: Inscape–Tableaux (Intakt)
2005: Oort–Entropy (Intakt)

With Barry Guy and Raymond Strid
1996: You Forget to Answer (Maya)
1997: Gryffgryffgryffs: The 1996 Radio Sweden Concert (Music & Arts)

With Gord Grdina Trio
2010: Barrel Fire (Drip Audio)

With Kieran Hebden & Steve Reid
2011: Live at the South Bank (Smalltown Superjazzz)

With The Sons of God
2011: Reception (Firework Edition)

With Masami Akita & Jim O'Rourke
2011: One Bird Two Bird (Editions Mego)

With Colin Stetson
2012: Stones (Rune Grammofon)

With Ich Bin N!ntendo including Christian Skår Winther, Joakim Heibø Johansen & Magnus Skavhaug Nergaard
2012: Ich Bin N!ntendo & Mats Gustafsson (Va Fongool)

With The Ex
2013 Enormous Door (Ex Records)

With Agustí Fernández & Ramon Prats
2013: Breakin the Lab! (Discordian)

With Correction
2013: Shift (Otoroku)

With Merzbow & Balázs Pándi
2013: Cuts (RareNoise)
2015: Live in Tabačka 13/04/12 (Tabačka)

With Merzbow, Balázs Pándi & Thurston Moore
2015: Cuts of Guilt, Cuts Deeper (RareNoise)

With Craig Taborn
2015: Ljubljana (Clean Feed)

With Paul Rutherford
2002: Chicago 2002 (Emanem)

Bibliography 
 T. Millroth: "Aaly Trio", Orkester journalen, lvi/4 (1988), 11 .
 M. Chaloin: "Mats Gustafsson", Improjazz, no.19 (1995), 6.
 W. Montgomery: "Mats Gustafsson: Flow Motion", Wire, no.164 (1997), 18.
 J. Hale: "Mats Gustafsson", Coda, no.288 (1999), 17.

References

External links 
 Official site 
 Swedish Music Information Centre · Jazz Facts: Mats Gustafsson (1999) (unavailable?)
 Mats Gustafsson (1999) [incl. discography].
 J. Guthartz: discography and index of compositions (2000).

1964 births
Living people
21st-century Swedish male musicians
21st-century saxophonists
Free jazz musicians
Male jazz musicians
Male saxophonists
Swedish jazz saxophonists
The Thing (jazz band) members
Incus Records artists
Rune Grammofon artists
Smalltown Supersound artists
Utech Records artists
Atavistic Records artists
NoBusiness Records artists
RareNoiseRecords artists
Okka Disk artists